Cretteville is a former commune in the Manche department in Normandy in north-western France. On 1 January 2016, it was merged into the commune of Picauville.

World War II
After the liberation of the area by Allied Forces in 1944, engineers of the Ninth Air Force IX Engineering Command began construction of a combat Advanced Landing Ground outside of the town.  Declared operational on 4 July, the airfield was designated as "A-14", it was used by the 358th Fighter Group which flew P-47 Thunderbolts until mid-August when the unit moved into Central France. The 406th Fighter Group took its place at the airfield and continued to fly P-47s until early September. Afterward, the airfield was closed.

See also
Communes of the Manche department

References

Former communes of Manche